Robert Scott (1854–1944) was a Reform Party Member of Parliament in New Zealand.

He was elected to the Tuapeka electorate in 1908, and for Otago Central in 1911. He was defeated for Wakatipu in 1919.

He was later on the Legislative Council.

References

1854 births
1944 deaths
Reform Party (New Zealand) MPs
Members of the New Zealand Legislative Council
Reform Party (New Zealand) MLCs
Unsuccessful candidates in the 1919 New Zealand general election
Members of the New Zealand House of Representatives
New Zealand MPs for South Island electorates